General elections were held in Gibraltar on 21 September 1956. The Association for the Advancement of Civil Rights remained the largest party in the legislature, winning four of the seven elected seats.

Electoral system
The legislature was elected by single transferable vote, with the number of elected seats expanded from five to seven.

Campaign
The AACR nominated four candidates, while the new Commonwealth Party nominated three. Three candidates ran as independents.

Results

Elected members

References

Gibraltar
General
General elections in Gibraltar
Election and referendum articles with incomplete results
Gibraltar